Boeing Creek and Shoreview Park is an  park system within Shoreline, Washington. The two parks share an internal border and both border Shoreline Community College.  Boeing Creek Park mainly consists of forested areas. Shoreview Park contains recreational facilities including tennis courts, baseball and soccer fields and an off-leash dog area. The upper portion of Boeing Creek flows along the western edge of Boeing Creek and Shoreview Park to Hidden Lake.

Natural History

Flora
Boeing Creek park has a largely intact native ecosystem, mostly free of invasive species. Habitats within Boeing Creek Park consist of Conifer forest, Conifer-deciduous forest, deciduous forest, and riparian forest along Boeing Creek. The conifer forest consists Douglas-fir, Western hemlock and Western red cedar trees. Salmonberry shrubs are common along the creek. The native species of Sword fern and Stinging nettle are common.

Shoreview Park habitats are Conifer-deciduous forest, Conifer-madrone forest,  Grassland, Shrubland and developed areas. Twelves acres of Shoreview Park contains invasive species such as Butterfly bush, Scotch broom, Himalayan blackberry, English ivy, and Herb Robert.

Fauna
Boeing Creek and Shoreview Park contain numerous bird species. Great blue heron, Bald eagle, and Pileated woodpecker have been observed within Boeing Creek Park. Rough-skinned newt have been observed along inlets to Boeing Creek.

History
In 1913 William Boeing, founder of the Boeing company, had a mansion built in The Highlands neighborhood, along Boeing Creek. Boeing owned the land that includes today's Shoreview and Boeing Creek Parks. He used the land primarily as a hunting retreat and had a small dam made, creating Hidden Lake which he used as a private fishing pond. The Innis Arden neighborhood began to be developed on this land after World War II. He donated the land that makes up Shoreview Park to the Shoreline School District. In 1997, the City of Shoreline assumed ownership of both parks.

References

Shoreline, Washington
Parks in King County, Washington